Christian Charles Roberts (17 March 1944 – 26 December 2022) was a British actor, best remembered for playing the rebellious Bert Denham, his debut film role in the 1967 movie To Sir, with Love starring Sidney Poitier and Judy Geeson.
Roberts was born in Southmoor, Oxfordshire. He was educated at Cranleigh School, Surrey, before attending the Royal Academy of Dramatic Art. Despite several screen appearances, much of his acting career was primarily based in theatre.
Roberts starred in the late 1960s cult science-fiction show UFO, playing the hippie-turned-alien spy in the final episode “The Long Sleep”.

Roberts died of cancer on 26 December 2022, at the age of 78.

Filmography

References

External links
 

1944 births
2022 deaths
20th-century English male actors
English male film actors
Male actors from Oxfordshire
People educated at Cranleigh School
Alumni of RADA
English male television actors